Kennedy Kiliku (died May 20, 2010) was a Kenyan politician. Until his death, Kiliku was chairman of National Labour Party (NLP). He was also the Changamwe MP from 1983 to 1997 and an articulate debater and critic of the Government.

Death
Kiliku died at a hospital after collapsing at his home in Mombasa. According to his wife, he had been complaining of chest pains before he was rushed to the hospital.

References

2010 deaths
Kenyan politicians
Year of birth missing